Camden Hills Regional High School (CHRHS) is a public high school in the town of Rockport, Maine in the United States. It is the sole high school of the Five Town Community School District, which consists of Camden, Rockport, Lincolnville, Hope, and Appleton.

Students
Camden Hills Regional High School mainly educates students in grades 9–12 from the Five Town CSD area. Students from other towns can pay tuition to attend the school, and some exceptions can be made in the case of students who are deemed essential to the school or at other administrative discretion.

The feeder K–8 school districts are Maine School Administrative District 28 and School Union 69.

Academics
Camden Hills Regional High School offers 27 English, 12 social studies, 16 language (French, Spanish, and Latin at various levels), 19 math, 16 science, 6 business, 9 visual media & technology, 11 industrial technology, 11 family & consumer science, 5 music, 14 art, 5 theater, and 3 physical education courses. This includes Advanced Placement classes in Biology, Calculus, European History, Language and Composition, Latin, Literature and Composition, Physics, Environmental Science, and United States History. The school also sends some students to the Midcoast School of Technology, which offers 14 different courses. The school also has a school-to-career program for juniors and seniors. In 2009, the school was ranked seventh out of 106 Maine high schools for average three-year achievement and average three-year growth in student achievement. Fifteen percent of the teachers at the school are Nationally Board Certified. The school has 13 students who were National Merit Semi-Finalists, and 4 students who were National Merit Finalists.

Athletics
In 2009, Sports Illustrated named the Camden Hills Regional High School athletic program the top program in the state of Maine. This was due in large part to the yearly success of the boys basketball, wrestling, and mountain biking teams, all three of which are consistently ranked highly in the state.

Camden Hills Regional High School offers cross country running, golf, mountain biking, soccer, field hockey, alpine and nordic skiing, basketball, ice hockey, baseball, softball, football, lacrosse, tennis, track and field, swimming, sailing, wrestling, and ultimate frisbee teams.

Notable alumni
 Tim Boetsch – mixed martial arts fighter
 Nathaniel Butler Jr. – former president of Colby College
 Sean Hill – neuroscientist
 Edna St. Vincent Millay – poet
 Gary Sukeforth – politician and businessperson
 Molly White – Wikipedia editor and writer

References

External links
 High school official Website
 School district website

Public high schools in Maine
Schools in Knox County, Maine
Camden, Maine
Rockport, Maine